The Lord is my shepherd are the first words of Psalm 23 (King James version).

The Lord is my shepherd may also refer to:
 The Lord Is My Shepherd (Eastman Johnson), an oil on wood painting (1863)
 The Lord Is My Shepherd (Rutter), a choral composition by John Rutter setting verses from Psalm 23 (1978)
 "The Lord's My Shepherd", a 1650 hymn attributed to Francis Rous